The 1897 Texas Longhorns football team represented the University of Texas at Austin in the 1897 Southern Intercollegiate Athletic Association football season.

Schedule

References

Texas
Texas Longhorns football seasons
Texas Longhorns football